2014 FIFA World Cup Brazil is the official video game for the 2014 FIFA World Cup, published by EA Sports for PlayStation 3 and Xbox 360. It was released on 15 April 2014 in  North America, and 17 April 2014 in Europe, as was the case with the 2010 edition.

Gameplay
Gameplay improvements from FIFA 14 include dribbling and increased accuracy in passing and first-touch mechanics.

The game's campaign mode, Road to Rio de Janeiro, allows players to play through qualification and the actual FIFA World Cup. For only the third time in the history of World Cup video games, the entire qualification series will be playable. The 2010 version only presented the UEFA and CONMEBOL groups in their true to life form. Another mode, Road to Rio de Janeiro, will allow players to compete in an online tournament across the 12 venues of the 2014 FIFA World Cup. It is similar in format to Seasons in FIFA 14 and Expedition mode from UEFA Euro 2012.

Captain Your Country, Online FIFA World Cup, Story of Qualifying, and Story of the Finals modes (the latter two integrated with EA Sports Football Club) from the 2010 edition returned to the 2014 edition.

For the first time in the FIFA series, coaches as well as spectators, either in the stadium or through FIFA Fan Fest and generic viewing events worldwide, are included to improve the immersive feeling. Coaches and spectators will react to happenings on the pitch, from scoring a goal to getting a card and winning the World Cup. Then-FIFA president Sepp Blatter even appears to present the World Cup trophy to the captain of the winning team at the final.

Teams and venues
The game contains all of the 204 national teams that took part in the 2014 FIFA World Cup qualification process. The national teams of Bhutan, Brunei, Guam, Mauritania, Mauritius and South Sudan, all of which did not participate in World Cup qualifying, despite being FIFA members, do not feature in the game. Most teams have licensed kits as well as kits worn during the World Cup for all 32 teams that qualified in real life plus other selected teams that did not, while other teams have generic unlicensed kits which resemble their official kits. As with the 2010 game however, all teams contain fully licensed players and stats.

The game includes all 12 venues used at the 2014 FIFA World Cup, as well as stadiums from each qualifying region and a range of generic stadiums.

Soundtrack
The official song of the World Cup, "We Are One (Ole Ola)" by Pitbull, Jennifer Lopez and Claudia Leitte, was included in the game's opening cutscene, as well as "The World Is Ours" by The X Factor USA contestant David Correy, which was soft drink company and World Cup sponsors Coca-Cola's theme song for the 2014 tournament.

Additionally, the game features EA Sports Talk Radio, where players can choose one of three channels, each featuring a pair of pundits commenting on user-controlled teams' progress and answering e-mails, texts, and tweets. Andy Goldstein of TalkSPORT and Ian Darke of ESPN host one channel, while the Men in Blazers (Michael Davies and Roger Bennett - both of ESPN at the time but now with NBC Sports) host the second channel and the third channel features the voices of Ian St John and Jimmy Greaves, famous for their partnership at ITV hosting Saturday afternoon football preview show Saint and Greavsie between 1985 and 1992.

The game includes 34 tracks from artists all over the world including Australia, Canada, Israel, Mexico, the United States and  Brazil.

Reception2014 FIFA World Cup Brazil'' received "mixed or average" reviews from critics, according to Metacritic.

Platforms criticism
The game was criticised for being available on only a few platforms. Despite releasing the game during the eighth generation of video game consoles, Electronic Arts decided against developing versions of the game for the PlayStation 4, the Xbox One or PC, as there were several major regions in the world where such systems were not adopted widely enough, especially the host country, Brazil.

References

External links
Official website

Video game
2014 video games
World Cup 2014
Electronic Arts games
PlayStation 3 games
Video games developed in Canada
Video games set in Brazil
Xbox 360 games
EA Sports games
FIFA World Cup video games
Video games set in 2014
Multiplayer and single-player video games